Lesego Ethel Motsumi ( – 9 January 2023) was a Botswanan politician. She was the Minister of Health until November 2004, when she became the Minister of Works and Transport. In the 2008 cabinet reshuffle, held upon the appointment of then president Ian Khama, Motsumi reverted to her old post as Minister of Health. From 2011 to 2019, she served as Botswana's High Commissioner to India.

Motsumi died in her homestead from burns that resulted from an explosion when she was burning some refuse on 9 January 2023, at the age of 58.

Sources

 Lesego Motsumi at the African People's Database

1960s births
Year of birth missing
2023 deaths
21st-century Botswana politicians
21st-century Botswana women politicians
Health ministers of Botswana
Labour Ministers of Botswana
Transport ministers of Botswana
Members of the National Assembly (Botswana)
Women government ministers of Botswana
Deaths from fire
Accidental deaths in Botswana